Yugam  is a 2012 Indian Tamil-language thriller film directed by Pavan Sekar and starring Rahul Madhav and Deepti (of Pattalam fame).

Cast 
Rahul Madhav as Shiva
Deepti as Pooja
Pawan Kumar
Senthil
Jaymani
Ramesh

Production 
The film is directed by erstwhile cinematographer Pawan Sekar, who worked under Jeeva. In 2010, the film was shot in Chennai and the songs were shot in Ooty.

Soundtrack
Music by Ponraj and lyrics written by Lalithanand.

Reception 
A critic from The Times of India gave the film a rating of one out of five stars and opined that " The film is full of badly-staged scenes that are further made insufferable by the overpowering background score, poor cinematography (that gives it the feel of a dated TV serial) and a climax that is perhaps the film’s one and only — and unintended — joke". Malini Mannath of The New Indian Express wrote that "'Yugam' has an unusual plot, intriguing at times. But a taut screenplay and a more focused narration could have made it an engaging thriller".

Box office 
The film is a box office failure.

References 

2010s Tamil-language films
2012 films
Indian thriller films
2012 thriller films